Roar Johansen is the name of:

Roar Johansen (footballer) (1935–2015), Norwegian international footballer
Roar Johansen (football coach) (born 1968), Norwegian football coach, main coach of Sarpsborg 08